is a former Grand Prix motorcycle road racer from Japan. In 1959, Taniguchi became the first Japanese racer to compete at the world championship level when Honda entered him in the Isle of Man TT. His most successful season was in 1960 when he finished in tenth place in the 125cc world championship.

Motorcycle Grand Prix results 

(key) (Races in italics indicate fastest lap)

References 

Year of birth missing (living people)
Living people
Japanese motorcycle racers
50cc World Championship riders
125cc World Championship riders
250cc World Championship riders
Isle of Man TT riders